Mary Beever (1802 – 31 December 1883) was a British artist and botanist.

Life
Beever was born in Ardwick. Her father was a Manchester businessman. They lived in Derbyshire before moving to The Thwaite in Coniston in Cumbria. Mary and her sister Susannah found themselves in John Ruskin's circle. Mary was a keen botanist and her collections are in several museums. She was elected a member of the Botanical Society of London between 1839  to 1841.

Beever died in Coniston, Cumbria in 1883.

References

1802 births
1883 deaths
Artists from Manchester
People from Ardwick